The 2002–03 Florida Panthers season was their tenth season in the National Hockey League. The Panthers failed to qualify for the playoffs for the third consecutive season, but did host the 53rd All-Star Game.

Offseason
Rick Dudley was named the team’s new general manager.

Regular season

All-Star Game

The 53rd National Hockey League All-Star Game was held during the 2002–03 NHL season, and took place at the Office Depot Center in Sunrise, Florida, the home of the Florida Panthers, on February 2, 2003. It was the first All-Star Game since the 1997 All-Star Game to use the Eastern Conference – Western Conference format.

Final standings

Schedule and results

|- align="center" bgcolor="#FF6F6F"
|1||OTL||October 10, 2002||3–4 OT|| align="left"|  Tampa Bay Lightning (2002–03) ||0–0–0–1 || 
|- align="center" bgcolor="#CCFFCC" 
|2||W||October 12, 2002||5–4 OT|| align="left"| @ Atlanta Thrashers (2002–03) ||1–0–0–1 || 
|- align="center" bgcolor="#FFBBBB"
|3||L||October 15, 2002||1–4 || align="left"| @ Minnesota Wild (2002–03) ||1–1–0–1 || 
|- align="center" bgcolor="#FFBBBB"
|4||L||October 17, 2002||1–4 || align="left"| @ Chicago Blackhawks (2002–03) ||1–2–0–1 || 
|- align="center" bgcolor="#FFBBBB"
|5||L||October 19, 2002||1–4 || align="left"| @ Columbus Blue Jackets (2002–03) ||1–3–0–1 || 
|- align="center" bgcolor="#CCFFCC" 
|6||W||October 21, 2002||3–2 || align="left"|  Atlanta Thrashers (2002–03) ||2–3–0–1 || 
|- align="center" bgcolor="#CCFFCC" 
|7||W||October 23, 2002||4–1 || align="left"| @ Toronto Maple Leafs (2002–03) ||3–3–0–1 || 
|- align="center" bgcolor="#FFBBBB"
|8||L||October 24, 2002||3–5 || align="left"| @ New York Islanders (2002–03) ||3–4–0–1 || 
|- align="center" 
|9||T||October 26, 2002||1–1 OT|| align="left"|  Washington Capitals (2002–03) ||3–4–1–1 || 
|- align="center" bgcolor="#FFBBBB"
|10||L||October 28, 2002||1–6 || align="left"|  Tampa Bay Lightning (2002–03) ||3–5–1–1 || 
|- align="center" bgcolor="#CCFFCC" 
|11||W||October 30, 2002||3–2 OT|| align="left"| @ Dallas Stars (2002–03) ||4–5–1–1 || 
|-

|- align="center" bgcolor="#FFBBBB"
|12||L||November 2, 2002||1–3 || align="left"|  Atlanta Thrashers (2002–03) ||4–6–1–1 || 
|- align="center" bgcolor="#CCFFCC" 
|13||W||November 6, 2002||4–3 OT|| align="left"|  Pittsburgh Penguins (2002–03) ||5–6–1–1 || 
|- align="center" bgcolor="#FF6F6F"
|14||OTL||November 7, 2002||1–2 OT|| align="left"| @ Washington Capitals (2002–03) ||5–6–1–2 || 
|- align="center" bgcolor="#CCFFCC" 
|15||W||November 9, 2002||3–0 || align="left"|  Calgary Flames (2002–03) ||6–6–1–2 || 
|- align="center" 
|16||T||November 11, 2002||2–2 OT|| align="left"|  Chicago Blackhawks (2002–03) ||6–6–2–2 || 
|- align="center" 
|17||T||November 13, 2002||1–1 OT|| align="left"| @ Philadelphia Flyers (2002–03) ||6–6–3–2 || 
|- align="center" bgcolor="#FF6F6F"
|18||OTL||November 14, 2002||2–3 OT|| align="left"| @ Ottawa Senators (2002–03) ||6–6–3–3 || 
|- align="center" bgcolor="#FFBBBB"
|19||L||November 16, 2002||3–7 || align="left"|  San Jose Sharks (2002–03) ||6–7–3–3 || 
|- align="center" bgcolor="#FF6F6F"
|20||OTL||November 19, 2002||3–4 OT|| align="left"| @ Atlanta Thrashers (2002–03) ||6–7–3–4 || 
|- align="center" 
|21||T||November 20, 2002||3–3 OT|| align="left"|  New York Islanders (2002–03) ||6–7–4–4 || 
|- align="center" 
|22||T||November 22, 2002||3–3 OT|| align="left"| @ Phoenix Coyotes (2002–03) ||6–7–5–4 || 
|- align="center" 
|23||T||November 24, 2002||4–4 OT|| align="left"| @ Mighty Ducks of Anaheim (2002–03) ||6–7–6–4 || 
|- align="center" bgcolor="#CCFFCC" 
|24||W||November 27, 2002||5–2 || align="left"| @ Los Angeles Kings (2002–03) ||7–7–6–4 || 
|- align="center" bgcolor="#FFBBBB"
|25||L||November 30, 2002||2–5 || align="left"|  Vancouver Canucks (2002–03) ||7–8–6–4 || 
|-

|- align="center" bgcolor="#CCFFCC" 
|26||W||December 4, 2002||4–2 || align="left"|  Carolina Hurricanes (2002–03) ||8–8–6–4 || 
|- align="center" bgcolor="#CCFFCC" 
|27||W||December 6, 2002||2–0 || align="left"| @ Carolina Hurricanes (2002–03) ||9–8–6–4 || 
|- align="center" bgcolor="#FFBBBB"
|28||L||December 7, 2002||0–4 || align="left"|  Edmonton Oilers (2002–03) ||9–9–6–4 || 
|- align="center" bgcolor="#FFBBBB"
|29||L||December 10, 2002||2–5 || align="left"|  Philadelphia Flyers (2002–03) ||9–10–6–4 || 
|- align="center" 
|30||T||December 13, 2002||3–3 OT|| align="left"|  New York Islanders (2002–03) ||9–10–7–4 || 
|- align="center" 
|31||T||December 18, 2002||2–2 OT|| align="left"|  Toronto Maple Leafs (2002–03) ||9–10–8–4 || 
|- align="center" bgcolor="#CCFFCC" 
|32||W||December 20, 2002||3–0 || align="left"| @ Buffalo Sabres (2002–03) ||10–10–8–4 || 
|- align="center" 
|33||T||December 21, 2002||3–3 OT|| align="left"| @ Boston Bruins (2002–03) ||10–10–9–4 || 
|- align="center" bgcolor="#FF6F6F"
|34||OTL||December 23, 2002||2–3 OT|| align="left"|  Nashville Predators (2002–03) ||10–10–9–5 || 
|- align="center" bgcolor="#FFBBBB"
|35||L||December 27, 2002||0–4 || align="left"|  Dallas Stars (2002–03) ||10–11–9–5 || 
|- align="center" bgcolor="#FF6F6F"
|36||OTL||December 28, 2002||1–2 OT|| align="left"|  New York Rangers (2002–03) ||10–11–9–6 || 
|- align="center" bgcolor="#FF6F6F"
|37||OTL||December 30, 2002||1–2 OT|| align="left"| @ New York Islanders (2002–03) ||10–11–9–7 || 
|-

|- align="center" bgcolor="#CCFFCC" 
|38||W||January 1, 2003||2–1 || align="left"| @ New Jersey Devils (2002–03) ||11–11–9–7 || 
|- align="center" bgcolor="#CCFFCC" 
|39||W||January 2, 2003||4–1 || align="left"| @ Colorado Avalanche (2002–03) ||12–11–9–7 || 
|- align="center" bgcolor="#FFBBBB"
|40||L||January 4, 2003||2–3 || align="left"| @ Vancouver Canucks (2002–03) ||12–12–9–7 || 
|- align="center" bgcolor="#FF6F6F"
|41||OTL||January 8, 2003||1–2 OT|| align="left"|  Detroit Red Wings (2002–03) ||12–12–9–8 || 
|- align="center" bgcolor="#FFBBBB"
|42||L||January 10, 2003||1–2 || align="left"|  New Jersey Devils (2002–03) ||12–13–9–8 || 
|- align="center" bgcolor="#FFBBBB"
|43||L||January 11, 2003||2–12 || align="left"| @ Washington Capitals (2002–03) ||12–14–9–8 || 
|- align="center" bgcolor="#FFBBBB"
|44||L||January 13, 2003||2–6 || align="left"| @ New Jersey Devils (2002–03) ||12–15–9–8 || 
|- align="center" bgcolor="#CCFFCC" 
|45||W||January 15, 2003||3–0 || align="left"|  Boston Bruins (2002–03) ||13–15–9–8 || 
|- align="center" bgcolor="#CCFFCC" 
|46||W||January 18, 2003||3–0 || align="left"|  Pittsburgh Penguins (2002–03) ||14–15–9–8 || 
|- align="center" bgcolor="#FFBBBB"
|47||L||January 20, 2003||2–3 || align="left"|  Montreal Canadiens (2002–03) ||14–16–9–8 || 
|- align="center" bgcolor="#FFBBBB"
|48||L||January 22, 2003||1–2 || align="left"|  Ottawa Senators (2002–03) ||14–17–9–8 || 
|- align="center" bgcolor="#FFBBBB"
|49||L||January 24, 2003||1–3 || align="left"| @ Carolina Hurricanes (2002–03) ||14–18–9–8 || 
|- align="center" bgcolor="#CCFFCC" 
|50||W||January 25, 2003||3–2 OT|| align="left"|  Carolina Hurricanes (2002–03) ||15–18–9–8 || 
|- align="center" bgcolor="#FFBBBB"
|51||L||January 28, 2003||3–6 || align="left"| @ Montreal Canadiens (2002–03) ||15–19–9–8 || 
|- align="center" 
|52||T||January 30, 2003||2–2 OT|| align="left"| @ Detroit Red Wings (2002–03) ||15–19–10–8 || 
|-

|- align="center" bgcolor="#FFBBBB"
|53||L||February 5, 2003||0–6 || align="left"|  Toronto Maple Leafs (2002–03) ||15–20–10–8 || 
|- align="center" bgcolor="#CCFFCC" 
|54||W||February 6, 2003||6–0 || align="left"| @ Pittsburgh Penguins (2002–03) ||16–20–10–8 || 
|- align="center" 
|55||T||February 8, 2003||4–4 OT|| align="left"|  Tampa Bay Lightning (2002–03) ||16–20–11–8 || 
|- align="center" bgcolor="#FFBBBB"
|56||L||February 12, 2003||1–3 || align="left"|  New York Rangers (2002–03) ||16–21–11–8 || 
|- align="center" bgcolor="#FF6F6F"
|57||OTL||February 14, 2003||5–6 OT|| align="left"|  Boston Bruins (2002–03) ||16–21–11–9 || 
|- align="center" bgcolor="#FFBBBB"
|58||L||February 15, 2003||1–2 || align="left"|  Washington Capitals (2002–03) ||16–22–11–9 || 
|- align="center" bgcolor="#CCFFCC" 
|59||W||February 18, 2003||3–0 || align="left"| @ Montreal Canadiens (2002–03) ||17–22–11–9 || 
|- align="center" bgcolor="#CCFFCC" 
|60||W||February 20, 2003||4–3 || align="left"| @ Ottawa Senators (2002–03) ||18–22–11–9 || 
|- align="center" bgcolor="#CCFFCC" 
|61||W||February 22, 2003||4–2 || align="left"| @ Philadelphia Flyers (2002–03) ||19–22–11–9 || 
|- align="center" 
|62||T||February 24, 2003||2–2 OT|| align="left"|  Buffalo Sabres (2002–03) ||19–22–12–9 || 
|- align="center" bgcolor="#FFBBBB"
|63||L||February 26, 2003||1–2 || align="left"|  Mighty Ducks of Anaheim (2002–03) ||19–23–12–9 || 
|- align="center" bgcolor="#FFBBBB"
|64||L||February 27, 2003||1–3 || align="left"| @ Tampa Bay Lightning (2002–03) ||19–24–12–9 || 
|-

|- align="center" bgcolor="#FFBBBB"
|65||L||March 1, 2003||2–5 || align="left"| @ New York Rangers (2002–03) ||19–25–12–9 || 
|- align="center" bgcolor="#CCFFCC" 
|66||W||March 3, 2003||2–1 || align="left"| @ Toronto Maple Leafs (2002–03) ||20–25–12–9 || 
|- align="center" bgcolor="#FFBBBB"
|67||L||March 5, 2003||1–3 || align="left"|  Colorado Avalanche (2002–03) ||20–26–12–9 || 
|- align="center" bgcolor="#CCFFCC" 
|68||W||March 7, 2003||2–1 || align="left"| @ Atlanta Thrashers (2002–03) ||21–26–12–9 || 
|- align="center" bgcolor="#FFBBBB"
|69||L||March 8, 2003||0–4 || align="left"|  Buffalo Sabres (2002–03) ||21–27–12–9 || 
|- align="center" bgcolor="#CCFFCC" 
|70||W||March 10, 2003||2–1 || align="left"| @ New York Rangers (2002–03) ||22–27–12–9 || 
|- align="center" bgcolor="#FFBBBB"
|71||L||March 12, 2003||0–4 || align="left"|  Montreal Canadiens (2002–03) ||22–28–12–9 || 
|- align="center" bgcolor="#FFBBBB"
|72||L||March 15, 2003||1–4 || align="left"| @ Boston Bruins (2002–03) ||22–29–12–9 || 
|- align="center" bgcolor="#CCFFCC" 
|73||W||March 16, 2003||4–2 || align="left"| @ Pittsburgh Penguins (2002–03) ||23–29–12–9 || 
|- align="center" bgcolor="#FFBBBB"
|74||L||March 19, 2003||1–3 || align="left"|  Minnesota Wild (2002–03) ||23–30–12–9 || 
|- align="center" bgcolor="#FFBBBB"
|75||L||March 22, 2003||1–3 || align="left"|  Ottawa Senators (2002–03) ||23–31–12–9 || 
|- align="center" bgcolor="#FFBBBB"
|76||L||March 24, 2003||1–4 || align="left"|  New Jersey Devils (2002–03) ||23–32–12–9 || 
|- align="center" bgcolor="#FFBBBB"
|77||L||March 26, 2003||1–2 || align="left"| @ Buffalo Sabres (2002–03) ||23–33–12–9 || 
|- align="center" bgcolor="#FFBBBB"
|78||L||March 27, 2003||1–2 || align="left"| @ St. Louis Blues (2002–03) ||23–34–12–9 || 
|- align="center" 
|79||T||March 29, 2003||1–1 OT|| align="left"| @ Tampa Bay Lightning (2002–03) ||23–34–13–9 || 
|-

|- align="center" bgcolor="#FFBBBB"
|80||L||April 1, 2003||0–3 || align="left"| @ Washington Capitals (2002–03) ||23–35–13–9 || 
|- align="center" bgcolor="#CCFFCC" 
|81||W||April 4, 2003||4–1 || align="left"|  Carolina Hurricanes (2002–03) ||24–35–13–9 || 
|- align="center" bgcolor="#FFBBBB"
|82||L||April 6, 2003||2–6 || align="left"|  Philadelphia Flyers (2002–03) ||24–36–13–9 || 
|-

|-
| Legend:

Player statistics

Scoring
 Position abbreviations: C = Center; D = Defense; G = Goaltender; LW = Left Wing; RW = Right Wing
  = Joined team via a transaction (e.g., trade, waivers, signing) during the season. Stats reflect time with the Panthers only.
  = Left team via a transaction (e.g., trade, waivers, release) during the season. Stats reflect time with the Panthers only.

Goaltending

Awards and records

Awards

Transactions
The Panthers were involved in the following transactions from June 14, 2002, the day after the deciding game of the 2002 Stanley Cup Finals, through June 9, 2003, the day of the deciding game of the 2003 Stanley Cup Finals.

Trades

Players acquired

Players lost

Signings

Draft picks
Florida's draft picks at the 2002 NHL Entry Draft held at the Air Canada Centre in Toronto, Ontario.

Notes

References

Flo
Flo
Florida Panthers seasons
National Hockey League All-Star Game hosts
Florida Panthers
Florida Panthers